Kiwi Campus, commonly referred to as Kiwi, is a Colombian-owned startup company providing food deliveries in California, United States, using largely autonomous robots called Kiwibots. Started in 2017 at the University of California, Berkeley, the company also delivers to parts of the city of Berkeley, on the Stanford University campus in Palo Alto, and in San Jose.

Operations
Kiwi uses three kinds of robots: one to collect prepared orders from the restaurant, a semi-autonomous tricycle in which orders are sorted and taken most of the way to the delivery point, and a small four-wheeled "Kiwibot", which can carry up to five orders and four of which can fit aboard the tricycle, that navigates the last approximately 300 meters to the customer. The company claims an average delivery time of 27 minutes. The Kiwibots have digitally animated eyes; the customer gestures to cause the hatch to open.

The delivery robots, which are manufactured in China and assembled in Berkeley, have approximately a cubic foot of cargo space. They have six cameras and binocular vision for navigation and hazard avoidance and are largely autonomous; human operators at the company's center in Bogotá monitor their progress at waypoints and take control when needed, such as when crossing streets. They use artificial intelligence and machine learning, including deep learning, and autonomously modify their speed on sidewalks depending on the proximity of people. Initially an iPhone on top of the robot was the primary sensor, robots had to be trained with repeated runs on each route, and rough sidewalks caused problems for the small wheels, requiring careful human monitoring. When a robot encounters a serious problem, such as tampering or becoming lost because of imprecise GPS, the run is completed by a human on foot or on a Segway.

History
Kiwi Campus grew out of a courier delivery service started by Felipe Chávez, the CEO, in 2015 in Bogotá. In 2016, he founded the current company with CTO Jason Oviedo and COO Sergio Pachón in the University of California, Berkeley's Skydeck business incubator, soon substituting robots for human couriers after discovering the cost in the United States; he has said that he was shocked to find that when he ordered a pizza online (or, in an alternate version, a burrito), the delivery charge was almost as high as the price of the pizza. They first tried using a single robot for the entire distance between restaurant and delivery, but found that inefficient. 

The prototype Kiwibots were rolled out on the Berkeley campus in March 2017; as of May 23, 20 were operating on campus and in surrounding parts of the city. By early 2018 they were also operating on the Stanford University campus, and by late May 2018 they had filled more than 10,000 orders and were operating throughout the area bounded by Cedar and Sacramento Streets and Ashby and Piedmont Avenues. That month the company was planning expansion to the city of Palo Alto and to San Jose and Los Angeles in the remainder of 2018. They are also planning to expand into business to business deliveries. Chávez won an entrepreneurship award from MIT in November 2018.

In December 2018, a Kiwi delivery bot caught fire near the Berkeley student union because of a defective battery; a passerby used a fire extinguisher to put out the fire, and the company temporarily switched to human courier deliveries.

In August 2019, a pilot program in Sacramento was announced. In July 2020, the company began service in San Jose.

References

External links
 Official website

Online food ordering
Retail companies established in 2017
Transport companies established in 2017
Internet properties established in 2017
2017 establishments in California
American companies established in 2017